During World War II, Operation Pastel was the deception plan scheduled to protect Operation Olympic, the planned invasion of southern Japan. Pastel would have falsely portrayed a threat of an American-led invasion against ports in China via attacks on Formosa.

One of the notional military formations that was designated for use in the deception was the fictitious XXXV Airborne Corps. The Corps formed part of Operation Pastel Two, the deception plan for Operation Olympic.

The final version of Operation Pastel incorporated notional airborne landings, using dummy parachutists similar to those used on D-Day, in the interior of Kyūshū the day before the actual landings were to take place. The two-division fictional corps that was to carry out the landings was designated XXXV Airborne Corps.

Had Operation Pastel been carried out, the first elements of the XXXV Airborne Corps, quartering parties of the notional 18th Airborne Division, would have been depicted reaching Okinawa on August 15, 1945. Following this glider pilots were to be depicted as reaching Okinawa around August 20, 1945, followed by the troops of the real 11th (in the Philippines) and notional 18th Airborne Divisions, starting to arrive in Okinawa on September 1, 1945. On the same day the notional corps headquarters would have been activated.

References

External links
 
 

World War II deception operations
Cancelled military operations involving the United States
Japan campaign
Cancelled invasions
Cancelled military operations of World War II